Milestone (stylized as MILESTONE) is the eighth studio album released by the Japanese hip-hop group Lead on July 18, 2018, released over two years after their previous album The Showcase.

The album included the singles Tokyo Fever, Beautiful Day and Bumblebee.

Milestone was released in three separate editions; a CD only version, a 2CD edition that contained a special booklet, and a CD+DVD edition, which housed music videos for not only the new track "Love or Love?", but also the videos from the singles. This was the first time all of the music videos from prior singles were placed on the DVD to a studio album.

Information
Milestone is the eighth studio album released by the Japanese hip-hop group Lead, released two years after their previous studio album The Showcase. The album debut at #8 on the Oricon Albums Charts, but climbed to the #7 position, taking the weekly ranking of #8. This became their third consecutive album to chart in the top ten on Oricon, which began with their 2012 album Now or Never. By week seven, the album was at #37, making it their longest charting album.

The album was released in three separate editions: a standard CD containing thirteen musical tracks; a type A CD+DVD edition, which housed music videos for not only the new track "Love or Love?", but all the videos from the singles; and a type B 2CD edition that contained thirteen tracks on the first disc and Mokudan radio show, which was hosted by the group, and a special booklet. The type A and B editions were also given first press limited editions, which included tickets to the group's upcoming tour Lead Upturn 2018 ~Milestone~.

Milestone became the group's first album to harbor all of the corresponding singles' music videos. These were "Tokyo Fever" (2017), "Beautiful Day" and "Shampoo Bubble" from Beautiful Day (2017), and "Bumblebee" (2018).

As a special promotion, beginning July 18 on both Amazon Japan and at CD shops nationwide, buyers were able to get one of two possible "Lead Special Posters" when they purchased either the limited type A or B edition of the album. The posters were available on a first-come, first-served basis. In the first press limited editions of both type A and B of Milestone, special participation tickets were included to the group's nationwide tour Lead Upturn 2018 ~Milestone~, which began August 5, 2018. There were two tickets placed in with the first press editions of the album, combined with a "Changing Jacket Set", that included one of three possible versions.

Promotional activities
Prior to the album's release, the group had released three singles: Tokyo Fever, Beautiful Day and Bumblebee.

Tokyo Fever was the twenty-seventh single by Lead, and became their ninth consecutive single to chart in the top five on the Oricon Singles Charts. The single was released in four editions: a standard CD and three limited CD+DVD renditions. Each of the CD+DVD editions carried a different b-side, while all editions carried the title track and the coupling track "Bokura no Yogaakeru Made", along with their corresponding instrumentals. Beautiful Day was the twenty-eighth single, becoming the group's tenth consecutive single to chart in the top ten on the Oricon Singles Charts, taking #6 for the week. It was released as a standard CD and three limited CD+DVD editions. The standard edition contained the title track and the two b-sides "Shampoo Bubble" and "Say Good-bye Say Hello", the first of which were placed on Milestone, as was the image video footage.

Bumblebee was the twenty-ninth domestic single, peaking at #2 on the Oricon Singles Charts. It was released in four editions: a standard CD, two CD+DVD editions with varying content and a version housing the CD and booklet.

As a special promotion, which began on July 18 with Amazon Japan and at CD shops nationwide, buyers were able to get one of two possible "Lead Special Posters" when they purchased either the limited type A or B edition of the album. The posters were available on a first-come, first-served basis. In the first press limited editions of both type A and B of Milestone, special participation tickets were included to the group's nationwide tour Lead Upturn 2018 ~Milestone~, which began August 5, 2018. There were two tickets placed in with the first press editions of the album, combined with a "Changing Jacket Set", that included one of three possible versions.

Music videos
Prior to the album's release, music videos were released for the songs "Bumblebee," "Tokyo Fever" and "Beautiful Day". There was one new music video created for the album for the song "Love or Love?".

"Love or Love?" was much darker than previous videos. It opens with the trio against a backdrop of neon lights, before introducing each member in solo positions. Much like their other videos, the video is dance-focused. Each member is given a solo after the mid-point of the video, showcasing darker aspects that they had not touched on in previous videos. Keita is shown using sensual red candles, Shinya is shown consuming pomegranate in a sensual manner and Akira is shown with leather handcuffs, which are typically utilized in BDSM. Each member also holds a significant object close to the camera: Akira holds red lipstick, Shinya holds whipped cream and Keita holds up a glass of red wine.

On June 29, 2018, Pony Canyon's official YouTube uploaded the music video of "Love or Love?" to help promote the album.

Though not released on the DVD, the song "Backpack" was given a music video. For the song, the Akira, Shinya and Keita perform the choreography on 21st Century Forest Beach on Okinawa Island. The footage also shows the group around the beach, going to local shops and swimming in the ocean. The dance utilized was choreographed by SUN-CHANG and the dancers in the video were SUN-CHANG, Kyo and Daik.

The video of "Backpack" was uploaded to Pony Canyon's official YouTube on October 10, 2018.

Track listing
(Official Track List)

Personnel
Credits are adapted from album’s Liner Notes
Musicians
Shinya Tanuichi - vocals
Keita Furuya - vocals
Akira Kagimoto - vocals

Production
Naotaka Yamaguchi - producer
Hajime Kodama - director
Masato Mukaida - director
Yoshihiro Kinoshita - coordination
Yukihito Sakakibara - music producer
Takashi Kasuga - supervisor
T. Taira - executive producer
Atsushi Chiba - executive producer
Hideaki Hiraki - artist management
Takashi Tsuboi - audio and recording
Kazuto Hiraga - products coordinator
Takashi Kasai - sales promotion
Nobuaki Iijima - art direction
Misa Tsukagoshi - design
Yuriko Saito - design
Michito Goto - photographer
Yuya Murata - stylist
Shunsuke Takata - hair and make-up

Charts (Japan)

Album

Singles

References

External links
 Lead Official Site

2018 albums
Pony Canyon albums
Lead (band) albums